Novius cardinalis (common names vedalia beetle or cardinal ladybird) is a species of ladybird beetle native to Australia. It was formerly placed in the genus Rodolia, but that genus was synonymized under the genus Novius in 2020.

Description 
It is reddish-purple with black spots localized in several parts of its body, forming a net of contours between the spots. The head, posterior part of the prothorax across the full width, and the scutellum are all black.

There are typically five black spots on the elytron. Four of those are arranged on the dorso-lateral part of the elytron. The two anterior spots form an roughly half-moon shaped oval with the convexity directed towards the suture of the elytron. The two posterior ones make a more irregular shape, formed by the intersection of two circular spots. Finally, the fifth spot covers the length of the elytron's suture, enlarging towards the posterior stretch.

The antenna are short and slightly clubbed, composed of 8 items, of which the proximal is markedly pulled aside.  The legs have an extended and irregularly flattened tibia, forming a space housing the tarsus when at rest. The tarsus is composed of 3 tarsomeres, as in all coccinellids.

The left side has a series of tubercles, each bearing short bristles. It is a red which darkens with age in as the abdomen darkens.

Diet

N. cardinalis regularly feed on aphids and small mites, which makes them good as biological control agents. They are only predatory to things smaller than them. Most of their food is herbivores, as carnivores are more likely to injure them as they are slow. Their flying capacities are limited so hunting in the air is not possible.

It is an active predator of cottony cushion scale Icerya purchasi.

As introduced biological control agent

New Zealand
N. cardinalis was accidentally introduced to New Zealand, though they are no longer very common. An outbreak of cottony cushion scale in California took place in the late 19th century, which led to some being imported from New Zealand in 1888 to help protect citrus trees.

Australia
There is a seat in the Palmer Gardens in North Adelaide, South Australia carrying a plaque that reads: 
In recognition of the first ever major biological control success – the spectacular control of the cotton cushion scale insect in Californian citrus orchards by the predatory vedalia ladybird beetle. 
Collected in North Adelaide in 1888. 
Sponsored by the Australian Entomological Society, officially unveiled by the Rt Hon the Lord Mayor of Adelaide, on the occasion of the AGM of the Society, 27 September 1995

California
N. cardinalis was introduced into Californian citrus orchards in late 1888.

Distribution
Novius cardinalis is widespread to all continents except Antarctica: America (US, Central America, Caribbean, South America, from Venezuela to Chile and Argentina), Europe (Iberian Peninsula, France, Italy, Balkans, Russia), in Asia (Japan, India, Sri Lanka, Philippines, Taiwan, Siberia), in Africa (northern Africa, South Africa), in Oceania (Hawaii, Guam) and, of course, in its home region, Australia.

References

Beetles of Australia
Coccinellidae
Beetles of New Zealand
Beetles described in 1850
Taxa named by Étienne Mulsant